The flavans are benzopyran derivatives that use the 2-phenyl-3,4-dihydro-2H-chromene skeleton. They may be found in plants. These compounds include the flavan-3-ols, flavan-4-ols and flavan-3,4-diols (leucoanthocyanidin).

A C-glycosidic flavan can be isolated from cocoa liquor.

Casuarina glauca is an actinorhizal plant producing root nitrogen-fixing nodules infested by Frankia. There is a regular pattern of cell layers containing flavans.

References